Albert-Marie Schmidt (10 October 1901 – 8 February 1966) was a French linguist and one of the founding members of the Oulipo. In 1960, the three hundred and fiftieth anniversary of the birth of John Calvin, Schmidt wrote a comprehensive introduction to the life and work of Calvin that placed him in his proper historical perspective in the Protestant Reformation.

References

1901 births
1966 deaths
20th-century French non-fiction writers
Linguists from France
Oulipo members
20th-century French male writers
20th-century linguists